The Miami-Dade Police Department (MDPD), formerly known as the Metro-Dade Police Department (1981–1997), Dade County Public Safety Department (1957–1981), and the Dade County Sheriff's Office (1836–1957), is a county police department serving Miami-Dade County. The MDPD has approximately 4,700 employees, making it the largest police department in the southeastern United States and the eighth largest in the country. The department is still often referred by its former name, the Metro-Dade Police or simply Metro.

The MDPD operates out of eight district stations throughout Miami-Dade County and several specialized bureaus. The MDPD is internationally accredited by the Commission on Accreditation for Law Enforcement Agencies, as well as at the state level by the Florida Commission for Law Enforcement Accreditation. The current director of the department is Alfredo Ramirez III, who succeeded Juan J. Perez. The department's headquarters are located in Doral, Florida.

Miami-Dade Police officers wear taupe/brown uniforms. Their vehicles are green and white.

History

The Dade County Sheriff's Office was created in 1836 to serve the newly created County of Dade, which originally consisted of the area comprising the present-day counties of Miami-Dade, Broward, Palm Beach and Martin. In the early years, the entire area was policed by as few as three deputies on horseback, and Dade's sheriffs were appointed by the governor. In 1899, the office of the sheriff became an elected position. By 1915, the jurisdiction area had been reduced to its present size of approximately 2,139 square miles.

In 1957, the metropolitan form of government was established, and the Dade County Sheriff's Office was subsequently renamed the Public Safety Department. The Public Safety Department's organizational structure, as determined by the metropolitan charter, included responsibility for police and fire protection, the jail and stockade, civil defense, animal control, and motor vehicle inspection. In 1960, the Public Safety Department also assumed responsibility for police operations at the Port of Miami and Miami International Airport. By 1966, the Public Safety Department had approximately 850 sworn officers in its ranks. That year a long-standing controversy over the selection/election procedure for choosing a county sheriff was resolved by voter mandate. Subsequently, non-elected sheriffs were appointed by the county manager as "Director of the Public Safety Department and Sheriff of Metropolitan Dade County."

In August 1968, roughly coincident with the Republican National Convention in Miami Beach, rioting broke out in Liberty City. Unable to control the situation, the Florida Highway Patrol and National Guard were brought in. Claiming they were being attacked by snipers, the police killed three people. No one was injured by sniper fire, and no weapons were found.

In 1973, the responsibility for running the county's jails was transferred to the newly created Department of Corrections and Rehabilitation. By that year, the Public Safety Department had also been divested of all other non-police responsibilities in order to concentrate entirely on law enforcement services. In July 1981, the Public Safety Department was renamed the Metro-Dade Police Department.

In September 1997, voters decided to change the county's name to Miami-Dade County. As such, the department was renamed the Miami-Dade Police Department the following December.

On September 13, 2007, four Miami-Dade Police Department officers were shot by a suspect with an AK-47, resulting in the death of one officer, Jose Somohano. Another officer suffered a serious leg injury. The suspect, Shawn Sherwin Labeet, fled the scene but was found in an apartment complex later that day. He was cornered in a poolhouse bathroom by members of Miami-Dade Police Special Response Team (equivalent to SWAT), and was shot and killed when he refused to drop a pistol he was holding.

On the morning of Thursday, January 20, 2011, two Miami-Dade Police officers were shot and killed by a homicide suspect, Johnny Sims. According to Miami-Dade Police Director James Loftus, the MDPD fugitive warrant team were assisting the U.S. Marshals Service in the city of Miami in apprehending the suspect, for whom a murder warrant had been issued. Police arrived at the suspect's mother's house and made contact with a member of the family, when the suspect surprised police by opening fire. Detective Roger Castillo, a 21-year veteran, was shot in the head and died at the scene, and Detective Amanda Haworth, a 23-year veteran, was shot several times and taken to Jackson Memorial Hospital's Ryder Trauma Center in grave condition. She underwent emergency surgery there, but died shortly thereafter. The suspect, Sims, was shot and killed by another detective at the scene.

In December 2019, the Miami-Dade Police Department came under scrutiny after a shootout in Miramar. MDPD officers, as well as police from other agencies, responded to fleeing robbers who carjacked a United Parcel Service van and took the UPS driver hostage. After a car chase, the MDPD killed the two suspects, the UPS driver, and an innocent bystander. The department received criticism for its officers' behavior, which included firing into open traffic and using civilian vehicles for cover. A total of 19 officers fired guns during the shootout, including 15 MDPD officers, 3 Miramar Police Department officers, and 1 Pembroke Pines Police Department officer.

Organization 
MDPD police stations include:

 Northwest District Station (Miami Lakes)
 Northside District Station (West Little River)
 Midwest District Station (Doral)
 South District Station (Cutler Ridge)
 Kendall District Station (Kendall)
 Intracoastal District Station (North Miami Beach)
 Airport District Station (Miami International Airport, Florida)
 West District Station (The Hammocks)

Contracted municipalities

 Town of Miami Lakes (1)
 Village of Palmetto Bay (4)
 Town of Cutler Bay (4)

Demographics 
Breakdown of the makeup of the rank and file of MDPD:

 Male: 75.58%
 Female: 24.42%
 White: 20.02%
 Hispanic: 58.11%
 African-American/Black: 20.58%
 Other: 1.29%

Ranks and insignia 

All rank insignia are worn on the collars of the shirt, except for sergeant, which is worn on each sleeve, below the department patch.

Specialized units 

 Arson Unit
 Auto Theft Unit
 Aviation Unit
 Bomb Squad
 K9 Unit
 Citizens Volunteer Program
 Communications Bureau
 Forensic Services Bureau
 Crime Stoppers – (305) 471-TIPS
 Court Services Bureau
 Drug Abuse Resistance Education
 Economic Crimes Bureau
 Warrants Bureau (assists US Marshal Service)
 General Investigations Unit (G.I.U.)
 Homeland Security Bureau
 Homicide Bureau
 Information Technology Services Bureau (ITSB)
 Professional Compliance Bureau
 Marine Patrol
 Motors Traffic Unit
 Public Information and Education Bureau
 Narcotics Bureau
 Neighborhood Resource Unit (N.R.U.)
 Organized Crime Section
 Personnel Management Bureau
 Police Legal Bureau
 Property and Evidence Section
 Public Corruption and Criminal Conspiracy Unit
 Robbery Bureau
 Robbery Intervention Detail (RID)
 Cargo Theft Task Force
 Street Terror Offender Program (S.T.O.P.)
 Special Patrol Bureau (Motorcycle, D.U.I. Certified)
 Special Response Team (S.R.T.)
 Special Victims Bureau (Sexual Battery & Domestic Crimes)
 Strategic Policing Operations Response Team (SPORT)
 Miami-Dade Public Safety Training Institute
 Underwater Recovery Unit
 Southeast Regional Domestic Security Task Force

Popular culture
The department has been depicted in a number of television shows, films, and video games:
CSI Miami
Miami Vice
Bad Boys as Miami Metro Police
Dexter as Miami Metro Police
Burn Notice
Grand Theft Auto: Vice City and Grand Theft Auto: Vice City Stories. Video games series, parodied as the Vice City Police Department.
Ace Ventura: Pet Detective as South Dade Police
Cocaine Cowboys
Miami SWAT
 Casino Royale
Driv3r
Pain & Gain
Kung Fury
Jane the Virgin
Super Fuzz
The Crew

See also

List of U.S. state and local law enforcement agencies
Sheriff (Florida)
Florida Highway Patrol
United States Border Patrol
Miami-Dade Fire Rescue Department

References

External links

 
County police departments of Florida
Government of Miami-Dade County, Florida
Doral, Florida
Police aviation units of the United States